Gilgit-Baltistan is an administrative territory of Pakistan in the northern part of the country. It was given self-governing status on August 29, 2009. Gilgit-Baltistan comprises 14 districts within three divisions. The four districts of Skardu Kharmang Shigar and Ghanche are in the Baltistan Division, four districts of Gilgit Ghizer Hunza and Nagar districts which were carved out of Gilgit District are in the Gilgit Division and the third division is Diamir, comprising Chilas and Astore (which was carved out of the Diamir District in 2004). The main political centres are the towns of Gilgit and Skardu.

Gilgit-Baltistan is home to some of the world's highest mountain ranges. The main ranges are the Karakoram and the western Himalayas. The Pamir mountains are to the north and the Hindu Kush lies to the west. Amongst the highest mountains are K2 (Mount Godwin-Austen) and Nanga Parbat, one of the most feared mountains in the world.

Many of the highest peaks in Gilgit-Baltistan, such as Baltoro Muztagh, K2 (Mount Godwin-Austen) (8,611 m), the second-highest mountain in the world), the Gasherbrums (7,932 - 8,080 meters, ranked 12-17 in the world), and Masherbrum (7,821 m), 22nd-highest in the world), lie in the Skardu District. Other high peaks are Distaghil Sar (7,885 meters, 19th-highest in the world), Kunyang Chhish (7,852 meters, 21st-highest in the world), Batura Sar (7,795 m), 25th-highest in the world), Kanjut Sar (7,790 m), 26th-highest in the world), and Rakaposhi (7,788 m), 27th-highest in the world.

Gilgit Division

Gilgit District
The Gilgit District is bounded by the Wakhan Corridor of (Afghanistan) in the north, Xinjiang (China) in the north and northeast, Skardu District in the south and southeast. The capital of the Gilgit District is Gilgit town.

The district includes Gilgit City, Nomal Naltar, Danyore, Jalalabad, Bagrote, Oshikhandas, Minawar, Parri, Juglote and Haramosh Valley.  The Haramosh valley having eight villages i.e. Hanuchal, Shota, Sassi, Daso, Hurban, barchy, jutiyal, and khaltaro, currently located within the Gilgit District, was previously located within the Skardu District. Gojal (Upper Hunza) Gulmit Gojal is the last tehsil there and (Sost) is the last stop of (Pakistan). Sost is the place where (Pak-China Dry Port) is located near a village (Hussainabad). 
The highest peak in the Gilgit District is Distaghil Sar (7,885 m), which is the 19th-highest mountain in the world.

Diamer Division

Diamir District 

The Diamir District is where the Karakoram Highway enters Gilgit-Baltistan from Pakistan's Khyber Pakhtunkhwa. The capital of the Diamir District is Chilas. The Diamir District is bounded by the Astore District in the east, the Khyber Pakhtunkhwa in the south and southwest (separated by the Babusar Pass or Babusar Top), the Darel District on the west, the Ghizar District in the north and northwest, and the Gilgit District in the north and northeast.

Before the Karakoram Highway was opened in 1978, the only road to Gilgit town from the south was a rough track north from Balakot to Babusar Pass (via Kaghan, Naran, Besal, and Gittidas) and further north through Babusar Pass to Chilas. The road up to Besal is now in better condition.
Darel valley the oldest civilization of whole gilgit baltistan. There is a Buddhist University in muhallah Phuguch.

Astore District
The Astore District was carved out of the Diamir District in 2004. Before that date, Gilgit-Baltistan was composed of five districts.

The capital of the Astore District is Eidgah, which includes many villages in the Astore Valley.

Astore district formerly comprised the area of Gilgit Wazarat.

The Astore District is bounded by the Diamir District in the west and the Skardu District in the east.

Some notable places in the district are Tarashing, Rupal, and Rama sar Lake.

Baltistan Division

Skardu District
The capital of the Skardu District is Skardu town. Skardu was part of Ladakh before the partition of Kashmir in 1948. The Baltoro Muztagh, the subrange of the Karakoram that includes the mighty peaks of K2 (8,611 m), Broad Peak (8,047 m), the Gasherbrums (8,000+ meters) and Masherbrum (7,821 m), is included in the Skardu District. Askole is the last settlement in the district for all treks to Concordia, the confluence of the Baltoro Glacier and the Mount Godwin-Austen Glacier). The Biafo Glacier and a major part of the Hispar Glacier are also located in the Skardu District. The district also includes almost all of the Deosai National Park, which is located on the second-highest plateau in the world.  (Only the Tibetan Plateau is higher). Skardu also is the district in which the Indus River enters Gilgit-Baltistan from the Indian state of Jammu and Kashmir.

Other towns in the Skardu District include:
 Gamba Skardu, Shigar Khas, Mehdi Abad, Sermik, Stak, Gulab Pur, Kharmang Khas, Kachura, Gultari, and Thowar.

The highest peak in the Skardu District is K2 (8,611 m), which is the second-highest peak in the world.

Hispar Pass and Gondoghoro Pass are also in the Skardu District. Some of the lakes in the district are Snow Lake, Satpara Lake, Sheosar Lake, Kachura Lake, and Shangrila Lake.

Ghanche District

The Ghanche District ("Ghanche" means the 'great glacier' and is written as "Gangche" by the local people) is the easternmost district of Baltistan. To the east is the Leh District of Ladakh (under administration of India). To the Northeast is Xinjiang (China), to the north and northwest is the Skardu District, to the west is the Astore District, and to the south is the Indian territory of Ladakh. The Actual Ground Position Line (AGPL) at the easternmost part of Ghanche District is located across the Saltoro Ridge. The Line of Control along the easternmost region of the Ghanche District ends before the start of the Siachen Glacier (entirely under control of India) at NJ9842. There has been a proposal made to turn the Siachen Glacier region into a peace park.

The capital of the Ghanche District is Khaplu. The Khaplu and Hushe Valleys form the gateway for the great Baltoro Muztagh, the subrange of the Karakoram that includes the mighty peaks of K2 (8,611 m), Broad Peak (8,047 m), the Gasherbrums (8,000+ meters), and Masherbrum (7,821 m)--all of which are located in the Skardu District.

The highest peak in Ghanche District is Saltoro Kangri (7,742 m), which is the 31st-highest peak in the world and is, in fact, under Indian control since 1984.

Some of the towns in the district are Khaplu, Keris, Doghani, Siksa, Balghar, Thaghas and Ghuwari.

Some rivers in the district are the Shyok River, the Hushe River, and the Thalle River.

Ghizar District
The Ghizar District is the westernmost district of the Gilgit-Baltistan. It is bounded by Pakistan's Khyber Pakhtunkhwa province on three sides (north, west, and south), by the Diamir District in the south and southeast, and by the Gilgit District in the east. A small strip of the Ghizar District (roughly 35x12 km) is sandwiched between the Khyber Pakhtunkhwa and the Wakhan Corridor of (Afghanistan). The capital of the Ghizar District is Gakuch.

The highest peak in the Ghizar District is Koyo Zum (6,871 m) in the (Hindu Kush Range) which lies on the boundary of the Ghizar District and the Khyber Pakhtunkhwa.

Some of the main places in the district are the Gulapur, singul, Ishkoman, and the Yasin valleys. Other places include Gupis, Chatorkhand, Imit, and Utz.

Some of the passes in the district are: 
 Karumbar Pass, Chillingi Pass.
Hayal Pass and Naltar Pass (on the boundary of Ghizar and Gilgit Districts).
Bichhar Pass  (on the boundary of Ghizar and Gilgit Districts).
Assumbar Pass, Thui Pass, Atar Pass, Nazbar and Zagar Pass, Darkot Pass. Darmadar Pass
The main river in the district is the Ghizar River, which is known as the Gilgit River to the east of Gupis town. Some of its tributaries include the Karambar River, the Ishkoman River, the Phakora River, and the Hayal River.

References

External links
 Gilgit-Baltistan detailed placemarks in Google Earth (with an overlay for district boundaries)